St. Peter's School or St. Peter School may refer to several educational establishments:

Australia
St Peters Public School, St Peters, New South Wales
St Peter's Woodlands Grammar School, Glenelg, South Australia

Canada
St Peter Catholic School, Guelph, Ontario
St. Peter Catholic High School, Orléans, Ontario
St. Peter Catholic Secondary School, Peterborough, Ontario
Saint Peter's School (Brantford, Ontario)
St. Peter's Catholic Secondary School, Barrie, Ontario

Ghana
St. Peter's Boys Senior High School, Nkwatia Kwahu

Hong Kong
, Aberdeen, Hong Kong
, Aberdeen Island, Hong Kong
, Shek Pai Wan Estate, Aberdeen, Hong Kong
, Hill Road, Shek Tong Tsui, Hong Kong

India
St. Peter's College, Agra, Uttar Pradesh
St. Peters School, Kadayiruppu, Kerala
St. Peter's School, Panchgani, Maharashtra

Ireland
St Peter's Community School, Cork, Republic of Ireland

Malaysia 
SMK St Peter Bundu, Kuala Penyu, Sabah

Myanmar/Burma 
 St Peter's High School, Mandalay

New Zealand
St Peter's School, Cambridge

Russia
Saint Peter's School (Saint Petersburg)

Spain
St. Peter's School, Barcelona, Spain

United Kingdom

England
St Peter's School, York
St Peter's School, Huntingdon, Cambridgeshire
St. Peter's College, Radley, Oxford
St Peter's Roman Catholic High School, Manchester
St Peter's School, Kettering
St Peter's School, Weston-super-Mare, a defunct boarding school attended by author Roald Dahl
St Peter's Middle School, Old Windsor
St Peter's Catholic School, Bournemouth
St Peter's Catholic School, Guildford
St Peter's Catholic School, Solihull
St Peter's Catholic High School, Wigan, Greater Manchester
St Peter's Collegiate Academy, Wolverhampton
St Peter's High School, Burnham-on-Crouch

Northern Ireland
St. Peter's Primary School, Charlemont, Charlemont, County Armagh, Northern Ireland

Scotland
St Peter's Roman Catholic Primary School, Aberdeen

United States
St. Peter High School (Minnesota), St. Peter, Minnesota
St. Peter's Preparatory School, New Jersey
St. Peter's High School (Mansfield, Ohio), Mansfield, Ohio
St. Peter's Boys High School, New York City
Saint Peter-Marian High School, Worcester, Massachusetts
Sanford-Brown College - St. Peters, St Peters, Missouri
St. Peter's School, Philadelphia
St. Peter's School, Waldorf, Maryland

Zimbabwe
Peterhouse Boys' School, named after Saint Peter
Peterhouse Girls' School, named after Saint Peter

See also
St. Peter Catholic School (disambiguation)
St Peter's Catholic School (disambiguation)
St. Peter's Secondary School (disambiguation)
St. Peter's College (disambiguation)
St. Peter's Primary School (disambiguation)
St Peter Chanel School (disambiguation)